Itaxia is a genus of sea slugs, specifically aeolid nudibranchs, marine gastropod molluscs in the family Coryphellidae.

Species 
Species within the genus Itaxia are as follows:
 Itaxia falklandica (Eliot, 1907)

References

Coryphellidae
Gastropod genera